Gamasellopsis is a genus of mites in the family Ologamasidae. There are at least four described species in Gamasellopsis.

Species
These four species belong to the genus Gamasellopsis:
 Gamasellopsis curtipilus Loots & Ryke, 1966
 Gamasellopsis longipilus Loots & Ryke, 1966
 Gamasellopsis magoebaensis Loots & Ryke, 1966
 Gamasellopsis vandenbergi Loots & Ryke, 1966

References

Ologamasidae